We Are Not Alone is a 1939 American drama film directed by Edmund Goulding and starring Paul Muni, Jane Bryan, and Flora Robson. The screenplay concerns a doctor who hires a woman as a nanny for his son. When his wife becomes jealous, tragedy consumes all involved. The film is based on the 1937 novel We Are Not Alone by James Hilton, who adapted his novel with Milton Krims.

Cast

Paul Muni as Dr. David Newcome
Jane Bryan as Leni Krafft
Flora Robson as Jessica Newcome
Raymond Severn as Gerald Newcome
Una O'Connor as Susan
Henry Daniell as Sir Ronald Dawson
Montagu Love as Major Millman
James Stephenson as Sir William Clintock
Stanley Logan as Sir Guy Lockhead
Cecil Kellaway as Judge
Alan Napier as Archdeacon
Eily Malyon as Archdeacon's Wife
Douglas Scott as Tommy Baker
Crauford Kent as Dr. Stacey
Billy Bevan as Mr. Jones
Holmes Herbert as Police Inspector
John Powers as Charley
Colin Kenny as George
Ethel Griffies as Mrs. Raymond
Olaf Hytten as Mr. Clark (uncredited)

Reception
Frank Nugent praised the film in his The New York Times review, writing "his [James Hilton's] We Are Not Alone emerges as a film of rare tenderness and beauty, compassionate and grave, possessed above all of the quality of serenity...one of the most soundly written films of the year, one of the best directed and, of course, one of the most brilliantly played."

References

External links

 
 

1939 films
1939 romantic drama films
American romantic drama films
American black-and-white films
1930s English-language films
Films scored by Max Steiner
Films based on British novels
Films directed by Edmund Goulding
First National Pictures films
Warner Bros. films
1930s American films